303 East 51st Street is a skyscraper  in the Turtle Bay neighborhood in Manhattan, New York City, New York, United States.

The building was under construction when, on March 15, 2008, the luffing-jib tower crane used to construct the skyscraper snapped off and fell, killing seven people in what Mayor Michael Bloomberg called the worst construction accident in New York City's recent history.

History
It was only a few months later that the crane collapsed and construction was halted.

Construction at the site was completed in 2015. The finished building, the Halcyon Building, has 32 floors and its street address is 305 East 51st Street.

Crane collapse
On March 15, 2008, a crane owned by New York Crane & Equipment collapsed during construction. Seven people were killed and 24 others were injured. The accident occurred when workers were attaching a new steel collar to anchor it to the building at the 18th floor, as part of an operation to extend the crane upwards. The OSHA investigation determined that the Favco instructions for lifting a stabilizing collar to the ninth floor level were not followed, using only half the number of polyester slings recommended. The overloaded slings failed, causing the collar to drop and dislodge two lower-level collars from the building. This left the crane without any lateral support, allowing it to topple.

Before the crane accident, New York City Department of Buildings (DOB) had already issued 13 citations for safety violations at the construction site, two of which were considered serious violations. The DOB and Mayor Michael Bloomberg later stated, to the ire of local residents, that the infractions were normal for a project of that scale.

Furthermore, after 311 registered a complaint stating the crane had become structurally detached from the building, the DOB scheduled an inspection for March 4, 2008, a little over one week before the crane collapsed. On March 4, a DOB inspector filed a report stating that no safety violations were identified at the site; however, the inspector was later charged with falsifying a report after it was determined that no inspection took place on March 4. The DOB commissioner stated that, even if the site had been inspected on March 4, the collapse would not have been prevented because the crane was in a different position at the time of the collapse.

In the wake of the crane accident, the owners of a 2nd Avenue building that was damaged when the crane collapsed were planning to demolish the building when they were sued by the owner of Crave Ceviche Bar, a tenant of the building, in response to those plans. The building owner said the building had sustained irreparable damage and it therefore must be demolished so the owner could rebuild. The building owner settled the lawsuit and a settlement of over $1 million was agreed upon, which allowed the owner of Crave Ceviche Bar to reopen in a different location and therefore continue his business.

References

External links
Slideshow of the collapse scene

2008 disasters in the United States
2008 industrial disasters
Construction accidents in the United States
Disasters in New York City
Skyscrapers in Manhattan
Turtle Bay, Manhattan